Vidar Nakling (born 1950) is a Norwegian competitive shooter who won the 1980 IPSC European Handgun Championship, and four time Norwegian IPSC Handgun Champion (1983, 1984, 1987 and 1990). He is the father and coach of IPSC World Champion Hilde Nakling and has written a book on how to succeed in dynamic pistol shooting.

References

External links 
 Official web page

1950 births
Living people
IPSC shooters
Norwegian male sport shooters
Norwegian non-fiction writers